Twelve Nights is a 2018 South Korean television series starring Han Seung-yeon and Shin Hyun-soo. It is produced by and aired on Channel A's Fridays at 23:00 KST time slot from October 12 to December 28, 2018.

Synopsis
It tells the story of two people who spend twelve nights together over three trips in 2010, 2015 and 2018.

Cast

Main
 Han Seung-yeon as Han Yoo-kyung
 Shin Hyun-soo as Cha Hyun-oh

Supporting
Jang Hyun-sung as Lee Baek-man
Yoo Joon-hong as Ban Koo-wal
Hwang Jae-won as Yoon Chan
Kim Do-wan as Yoo Chan
Ye Soo-jung as Lee Ri
Lee Ye-eun as Kang Chae-won
Kim Bum-jin as Yoo Ki-tae
Lee Joo-young as Sophia
Han Ji-eun as Park Sun-joo
Woo Ki-hoon as Yoo Shik-eun
Lee Sun-tae as Lee Kyu-jin
Bret Lindquist as Thomas
Seo Eun-woo as Moon Hye-ran
Cha Soo-yeon as Yoon Hong-joo
Sung Chang-hoon as Kim Jae-wook
Lee Gun-woo as Kang Eun-pyo
Kim Yi-kyung as Joo A-reum
Hwang So-hee as Park Se-jung
Felipe Arca as Pierre
Kim Young-joon as Kang Seok
Han Da-sol as Cheon Da-young

Production
The first script reading took place early in June 2018 at Donga Digital Media Center in Sangam-dong, Seoul, South Korea.

References

External links
  
 
 

Channel A television dramas
Korean-language television shows
2018 South Korean television series debuts
2018 South Korean television series endings
South Korean romance television series